Juho Mikkonen (born 28 December 1990 in Kuhmo) is a Finnish cross-country skier.

Mikkonen competed at the 2014 Winter Olympics for Finland. He placed 43rd in the qualifying round in the sprint, failing to advance to the knockout stages. He also competed at the 2021 FIS Nordic World Ski Championships in three events.

Mikkonen made his World Cup debut in March 2009. His best result in a World Cup race is 4th, in a freestyle sprint at Lillehammer in December 2014. His best World Cup overall finish is 78th, in the 2014–15 season. His best World Cup finish in a discipline is 36th, in the 2014-15 sprint.

Cross-country skiing results
All results are sourced from the International Ski Federation (FIS).

Olympic Games

World Championships

World Cup

Season standings

References

External links
 

1990 births
Living people
Olympic cross-country skiers of Finland
Cross-country skiers at the 2014 Winter Olympics
People from Kuhmo
Finnish male cross-country skiers
Sportspeople from Kainuu
21st-century Finnish people